St. Michael's Cathedral is the cathedral of the Roman Catholic Archdiocese of Alba Iulia, Romania, and is the oldest and longest cathedral in the country.

History 
The diocese of Gyulafehérvár was founded by Stephen I of Hungary in 1009. The construction of the first cathedral was begun that time, though was completed only in the end of the century, under the rule of Ladislaus I. During the same period, towards the end of the 11th century they began constructing the second cathedral. The transversal naves and the first part of the sanctuary of the present cathedral were built in Romanesque style. During the Mongol invasion of 1241, the church was destroyed. In the middle of the 13th century the cathedral was rebuilt on the old foundation, in the transitory style between Romanesque and Gothic. Not much later, in 1277, Saxons pillaged the cathedral and set it on fire. In the 15th century, the building was reconstructed. In 1439, it was again damaged after a Turkish invasion during the Ottoman–Hungarian wars. The archbishop of Esztergom and the regent-governor of Hungary, John Hunyadi contributed to the reconstruction – this was the time when the latter one chose the cathedral of Gyulafehérvár as a burial place. During the first part of the 16th century, the building was improved, and further parts were added to it. In 1601, during the Wallachian invasion led by Michael the Brave, the cathedral was pillaged, even the tombs of the Hunyadis were damaged. In 1603, the Habsburg army, led by Giorgio Basta sieged the building. In 1658, during the next invasion of the Ottomans, the cathedral was damaged again.

Architecture

Burials
A list of people interred here:
 John Hunyadi, Regent-Governor (1446–1453) of the Kingdom of Hungary
 Queen Isabella, the wife of John Zápolya
 John II Sigismund Zápolya, King of Hungary from 1540 to 1570 and Prince of Transylvania from 1570 to 1571  
 Andrew Cardinal Báthory, Prince-Bishop of Warmia, and Prince of Transylvania in 1599  
 Áron Márton (1896-1980), Roman Catholic bishop, Righteous Among the Nations

Gallery

References

11th-century Roman Catholic church buildings
13th-century Roman Catholic church buildings in Romania
Roman Catholic cathedrals in Romania
Historic monuments in Alba County
Buildings and structures in Alba Iulia
Romanesque architecture in Romania
Tourist attractions in Alba County
Michael's
Michael's
Michael's
Michael's
Michael's